The United Fruit Company strike of 1913 was a worker-led strike organized by the Industrial Workers of the World (IWW) in New Orleans against the United Fruit Company that was marked by violence.  

On June 13, 1913, an attempt to stop the loading of a ship by strikebreakers turned violent as police officers and private security guards opened fire on the strikers, killing two and wounding several.  

The strike was one of a series of strikes that were led by workers in other port cities, most notability in Philadelphia with the Marine Transport Workers. Most of these strikes were successful; however, the strike was a failure in New Orleans.

References 

1913 labor disputes and strikes
History of New Orleans
Labor disputes in Louisiana
Protest-related deaths
Industrial Workers of the World in Louisiana
1913 in Louisiana
Maritime labor disputes in the United States
United Fruit Company labor relations